"New Body" is an unreleased song by American rapper Kanye West featuring vocals from Ty Dolla Sign and Nicki Minaj. It was originally slated to be included on West's album Yandhi which was never released. The song's original lyrics are about body shaming and the stigma surrounding plastic surgery. A reworked version of the song featuring Christian-themed lyrics was later previewed at listening parties for West's ninth studio album Jesus Is King (2019). In June 2020, Minaj stated that she would contact West about potentially releasing the song after its leaked version became viral on TikTok.

The song was ultimately scrapped from Jesus Is King just before its October 2019 release due to creative differences between West and Minaj. Since being leaked online in July 2019 along with multiple other songs, the song received positive reviews and was noted for being a highlight among other leaked Yandhi tracks. Critics praised West's reworked Christian lyrics for being more positive and respectful. In January 2022 rapper Nicki Minaj in an interview stated that she might work on getting the record on her fifth studio album (2022).

Background and recording

Trinidad and Tobago-born rapper Nicki Minaj was previously prominently featured on West's fifth studio album My Beautiful Dark Twisted Fantasy (2010) and provided a voice memo for his eighth studio album Ye (2018), as well as West appearing on Minaj's debut studio album, Pink Friday. American singer Ty Dolla Sign was also featured on Ye, along with The Life of Pablo (2016) and Kids See Ghosts (2018), West's collaborative album with American rapper Kid Cudi. The song "Violent Crimes" from Ye features vocals from Ty Dolla Sign, along with American singer 070 Shake, and the voice memo from Minaj.

On September 9, 2018, West was spotted recording music with American rapper 6ix9ine. The two later flew to Colombia to record music together. On September 17, 2018, West announced his ninth studio album Yandhi, just three months after the release of his previous solo album Ye, revealing the cover art and initial release date of September 29, 2018. On September 27, West visited The Fader headquarters to preview new music from Yandhi. Songs previewed included vocals from Ty Dolla Sign and 6ix9ine. West took out a pocket dictionary and read the definition of the word "artificial", explaining his view that "a woman’s pussy count goes back to zero" after having any plastic surgery procedures done. The Fader reported that this explanation was related to the song that featured 6ix9ine. West would later feature on two tracks from 6ix9ine's debut studio album Dummy Boy (2018): "Kanga" and "Mama", with the latter also featuring Minaj.

While West was in New York City finishing up Yandhi for the season 44 premiere of Saturday Night Live, West's wife Kim Kardashian coordinated to get Minaj featured on "New Body". Before recording her verse, Minaj explained that she was "going to say some real ass shit that bitches need to hear, too, and that they want to say and be feeling like they can’t say." Minaj wrote her verse within an hour after Kardashian reached out to her. West failed to release Yandhi in September 2018. On October 1, 2018, West visited the TMZ office in Los Angeles to record a music video for  "We Got Love" with American singer Teyana Taylor. In an interview with TMZ's Raquel Harper, West confirmed that he had an upcoming song about body shaming that featured Ty Dolla Sign and Minaj. On March 8, 2019, GOOD Music audio engineer Kevin Celik confirmed that the Yandhi track featuring Minaj and Ty Dolla Sign was titled "New Body". Celik stated that the "record for sure is Kim K-inspired", referring to Kardashian.

During listening parties for Jesus Is King in September 2019, West previewed a reworked version of "New Body". In October 2019, Minaj stated that she was rerecording her verse to fit the religious theme of Jesus Is King, but that she and West were having disagreements. Minaj explained that West wanted to rework the track as a gospel song, adding "I done wrote three different verses chile, and I don’t know. We ain’t seeing eye to eye on it. I don’t know, but of course, I love and respect Kanye, and Kim, we’ll see what happens with that". "New Body" was previewed at a Jesus Is King listening party at The Forum in Los Angeles two days before the album's release date, but was removed from the final track listing for the album revealed the next day. The track was ultimately scrapped from the album due to the creative differences between Minaj and West.

In June 2020, Nicki Minaj stated that she would contact West about potentially releasing the song after it became viral on TikTok. Later that month, she urged fans to spam Kardashian for the song's release.

On Ty Dolla Sign's third studio album, Featuring Ty Dolla Sign (released October 23, 2020), on the track "Status", one of Ty Dolla Sign's verses covers how he tried to get West to release the song, and West replied that the song was "generic shit" that Ty Dolla Sign's voice was too good for.

Themes and lyrics
The original leaked version of "New Body" addressed the issues of slut-shaming and body shaming. Charles Holmes of Rolling Stone called the song West's "ode to the wonders of plastic surgery and the myths of body count". West explained the concept of "New Body" in an October 2018 interview, stating:

Holmes described the reworked version of the song previewed in September 2019 as Christian-appropriate and that the "body is [now] simultaneously more metaphorical and metaphysical". Joe Coscarelli of The New York Times wrote that the song had been "altered for content, turning its more secular, sexual lyrics to something more chaste and respectful." Danilo Castro of Heavy.com noted that the reworked song had no curse words and "a more positive overall message."

Promotion and leak

West announced that he had a song with Minaj and Ty Dolla Sign about body shaming in an October 2018 interview with TMZ. The recording of Minaj's verse was prominently showcased in an April 2019 episode of American television series Keeping Up with the Kardashians. Following the airing of the episode, Kardashian discussed the writing of the song on Twitter. "New Body" was leaked online in July 2019 alongside another Yandhi track titled "The Storm", featuring Ty Dolla Sign and posthumous vocals from American rapper XXXTentacion. "The Storm" was scrapped and reworked for Jesus Is King as "Everything We Need". Paul Thompson, writing for The Fader, noted that the leaks did not receive mainstream attention and were a "minor story" compared to West songs that had leaked previously. A music video for "New Body" was recorded but never released.

"New Body" was previewed by West at multiple listening parties for Jesus Is King throughout September and October 2019. "New Body" was notably absent from the listening party in Chicago, but was later re-added to the track list at further parties. "New Body" was last previewed at the listening party at The Forum in Los Angeles two days before the album's release date, but was removed from the final track listing for the album revealed the next day. The song was scrapped from the album and never released due to West and Minaj's creative differences.

Critical reception
Paul Thompson, writing for The Fader, compared "New Body" to other Yandhi leaks as being "in various states of progress". Thompson praised the production and polishing on Ty Dolla Sign's hook and Minaj's verse, but described West's verse as still being in demo form as he "lapse[s] from finished lines into mumbles reference phrases". Thompson praised "New Body" and the other Yandhi leaks for having "more shape and direction that nearly anything on [Ye]" despite the unfinished lyrics. In writing for Rolling Stone, Thompson called it "the one song from the Yandhi leaks that sounded like it might be a hit."

Sam Murphy, writing for Cool Accidents, described the song as becoming "a superfan favourite" ever since it leaked. Brian McCollum of the Detroit Free Press described the reworked version of the song previewed at listening parties as "quickly infectious". Danilo Castro of Heavy.com described "New Body" as "one of the most hotly contested tracks on Jesus Is King."

References

2019 songs
Body image in popular culture
Unreleased songs
Kanye West songs
Songs written by Kanye West
Ty Dolla Sign songs
Songs written by Ty Dolla Sign
Nicki Minaj songs
Songs written by Nicki Minaj
Songs written by Ronny J
Works about plastic surgery